Jozo Križanović (28 July 1944 – 2 December 2009) was a Bosnian politician who served as the 3rd Croat member of the tripartite Presidency of Bosnia and Herzegovina from 2001 until 2002. 

He was later on a member of the House of Representatives. Križanović was a member of the Social Democratic Party.

Career
In March 2001, Križanović replaced Ante Jelavić as the Croat member of the Presidency of Bosnia and Herzegovina. Jelavić had been removed from office by the decision of Wolfgang Petritsch, the High Representative for Bosnia and Herzegovina.

Križanović served as Chairman of the Presidency from June 2001 until February 2002. His term ended with the Bosnian general election on 5 October 2002. Dragan Čović was elected to replace Križanović as the Croat member of the Presidency.

Death
Križanović died from complications following surgery in Zagreb, Croatia on 2 December 2009.

References

1944 births
2009 deaths
People from Vitez
Croats of Bosnia and Herzegovina
Social Democratic Party of Bosnia and Herzegovina politicians
Members of the Presidency of Bosnia and Herzegovina
Chairmen of the Presidency of Bosnia and Herzegovina
Members of the House of Representatives (Bosnia and Herzegovina)